Carny, also known as Jersey Devil in Australia, is a 2009 Canadian television horror film by Syfy and the 17th film in the Maneater Series. The film was directed by Sheldon Wilson and stars Lou Diamond Phillips.

Plot 
An unseen creature is being delivered to a traveling carnival as a new addition to the freak show. The ringmaster, Cap kills the man who sold him the beast before he and his assistant Quinn attempt to bring the creature into the carnival's truck, tranquilizing it to calm it down. However, as Quinn heaves on the chains, the beast quickly recovers from the dart's effects and slashes his eye out before attempting to make its escape. Cap eventually shoots it with more tranquilizer darts, which causes the beast to finally pass out.

Sheriff Atlas comes to investigate Cap's carnival under the local paranoid pastor's requests. After meeting with several of the deformed carnies, and getting acquainted with the normal looking, but psychic Samara, Atlas meets with Cap, who takes him into the tent where the creature, a large, winged mammal-like beast, is being kept for the opening show. Atlas, shocked at the beast's hellish appearance and aggressive nature, suggests that it is not safe, but Cap is unconcerned and continues planning the public unveiling. During the opening show, the audience is shocked at the sight of the beast, but the pastor's unruly son Taylor  and his friend Jesse are unimpressed and taunt it by throwing peanuts at it, infuriating the beast enough to break free from its cage and begin terrorizing the carnival before escaping into the woods.

Later the following night, Taylor and Jesse hide in an old barn in the forest when a feral, blood-covered dog feeding off of a severed foot barks at them, alerting the beast to their location. The beast chases and kills the dog as Taylor and Jesse escape the barn only to get separated; the beast eventually finds Taylor hiding under a bridge and kills and dismembers him as Jesse hides in an old car. The next day, Jesse is found by Atlas and his team, alive but traumatized by the ordeal, while Taylor's mangled remains are found and taken away, which devastates the pastor and drives him insane with grief and rage. Atlas and his deputy find the remains of the man who sold the beast to Cap near the river, having been cut rather than mauled by the beast, determining it to be a homicide; the investigation is witnessed by Cap and Quinn, the latter of whom was responsible for disposing of the body on Cap's orders. Later, Atlas visits Samara and learns of the true origins of the beast: the Jersey Devil, the monstrous 13th child of Mrs. Leeds whose aggression is fueled by the scent and taste of blood. Meanwhile, when Jesse and his mother are driving down a road in the forest, the Jersey Devil suddenly attacks and kills them both.

Meanwhile, Atlas organizes a hunting party to find and kill the Jersey Devil before it can cause more chaos. Cap and Quinn, the former of whom wants the Jersey Devil alive in order to deliver it to a mysterious client, later try to recapture the beast by using more tranquilizer darts, running into Atlas and his deputy after accidentally injuring the latter. When Atlas leaves to hunt the Jersey Devil on his own, Cap seizes the opportunity to use Atlas' deputy as bait by shooting him with a dart and then having Quinn stab him to attract the beast with the smell of his blood. However, as the beast approaches, the deputy shoots at it and sends it fleeing right before succumbing to his wounds. The beast then sets its sights on Cap's carnival once more, only managing to kill one of his carnies, the "Leopard Woman", before being driven off by Atlas. Cap later tries once again to recapture the beast by stabbing Quinn to death to attract the beast with his blood. The beast soon arrives and sneaks up from behind Cap, who immediately shoots it with his new tranquilizer darts that "have enough drugs in them to put an elephant to sleep for a week", which knocks out the beast once more.

Cap returns to the carnival later that night to retrieve the beast, only to be stopped and arrested by Atlas, who had discovered part of the tranquilizer dart in his deputy's back. The pastor, who wants revenge on the beast and the carnival for the death of his son, knocks Atlas unconscious and locks him up to prevent him from interfering in his vengeance. The pastor cuts out Cap's tongue and prepares to finish him off, but the beast, having awakened from the darts and sensing Cap's blood after Atlas punched him in a fit of rage, arrives at the police station and kills Cap. After failing to shoot it, the pastor stabs the beast in its shoulders with two tranquilizer darts, eventually knocking it out once again. Believing it to be dead, he and his followers load the creature's body onto their truck and arrive at the carnival, where they begin to burn it down and kill most of the carnies. As the carnage unfolds, the beast awakens right before the pastor's eyes. As the pastor shouts in rage and disbelief at it being alive, the beast lunges at him and then kills him.

Atlas regains consciousness and frees himself from his cell before arriving at the now burning carnival, finding the pastor's dismembered corpse. He attempts to rescue Samara, and a final confrontation with the beast ensues as it chases them down, resulting in Atlas losing his gun and getting separated from Samara. It chases Samara to the Ferris wheel where the "Gentle Giant" attempts to stop it, only to be quickly subdued and killed by the beast. Atlas eventually rams the beast into the Ferris wheel with a car in an attempt to kill it. Atlas is able to keep the beast pinned against the Ferris wheel long enough for the ride to collapse on both of them. Though this kills the beast, Atlas is fatally injured, and shortly dies afterward, leaving Samara as the sole survivor of the attacks.

Cast 
 Lou Diamond Phillips as Atlas
 Simone-Élise Girard as Samara
 Alan C. Peterson as Cap
 Vlasta Vrána as Pastor Owen
 Matt Murray as Taylor
 Rick Genest as Carny

References

External links

2009 television films
Canadian science fiction horror films
English-language Canadian films
2000s English-language films
Films about cryptids
Maneater (film series)
Syfy original films
2009 horror films
2000s science fiction horror films
2009 films
Jersey Devil in fiction
Films directed by Sheldon Wilson
2000s American films
2000s Canadian films